Chenar (also Romanized as Chenār) is a village in Dorungar Rural District, Now Khandan District, Dargaz County, Razavi Khorasan Province, Iran. At the 2006 census, its population was 293, in 90 families.

References 

Populated places in Dargaz County